Giuseppe Vari (9 March 1924 – 1 October 1993) was an Italian film director, editor and screenwriter.

Life and career
Born in Segni, Rome, Vari started his career  as an editor of films and documentaries, collaborating among others with Federico Fellini, Damiano Damiani and Giorgio Simonelli. In 1953 he made his directorial debut with Infame accusa, then specialized in melodramatic films. From the early sixties he focused on genre films, especially Spaghetti Westerns, sometimes being credited as Joseph Warren.

Filmography

Director 
 Infame accusa, (also screenwriter, 1953)
 Due lacrime, (1954)
 Mamma, perdonami!, (1954)
 Vendicata!, (1955)
 Addio sogni di gloria, (also screenwriter, 1955)
 Il ricatto di un padre, (also screenwriter, 1957)
 Giovane canaglia, (also screenwriter, 1958)
 Spavaldi e innamorati, (1959)
 Revenge of the Barbarians, (1960)
 I normanni, (1962)
 Canzoni in... bikini, (1963)
 Rome Against Rome, (1964)
 Degueyo, (also screenwriter, 1966)  - under the name of Joseph Warren
 Poker with Pistols, (1967)  - under the name of Joseph Warren
 Death Rides Along, (1967)  - under the name of Joseph Warren
 L'ultimo killer, (also editor, 1967)  - under the name of Joseph Warren
 Un buco in fronte, (also editor, 1968)  - under the name of Joseph Warren
 Un posto all'inferno, (also editor, 1969)  - under the name of Joseph Warren
 Shoot the Living and Pray for the Dead, (also editor, 1971)  - under the name of Joseph Warren
 Il 13º è sempre Giuda, (also screenwriter, 1971)  - under the name of Joseph Warren
 Who Killed the Prosecutor and Why?, (1972)  - under the name of Joseph Warren
 Beffe, licenzie et amori del Decamerone segreto, (1972)  - under the name of Walter Pisani
 La padrina, (1973)  - under the name of Al Pisani
 Metti... che ti rompo il muso, (1973)
 Il lupo dei mari, (1975) - under the name of Joseph Green
 Suor Emanuelle, (also editor, 1977)  - under the name of Joseph Warren
 Ritornano quelli della calibro 38, (also screenwriter and editor, 1977)
 Urban Warriors, (1987)  - under the name of Joseph Warren

Screenwriter 
 L'attico, directed by Gianni Puccini (1962)

Film Editor 
 Il vento mi ha cantato una canzone, directed by Camillo Mastrocinque (1947)
 Accidenti alla guerra!..., directed by Giorgio Simonelli (1948)
 Amori e veleni, directed by Giorgio Simonelli (1949)
 The Transporter, directed by Giorgio Simonelli (1950)
 The Seven Dwarfs to the Rescue, directed by Paolo W. Tamburella (1951)
 La peccatrice dell'isola, directed by Sergio Corbucci (1952)
 Il Bidone, directed by Federico Fellini (1955)
 The Reunion, directed by Damiano Damiani (1963)  
 Quella dannata pattuglia, directed by Roberto Bianchi Montero (1969)

References

External links 
 

1924 births
1993 deaths
People from Segni
Italian film directors
20th-century Italian screenwriters
Italian male screenwriters
Spaghetti Western directors
Italian film editors
20th-century Italian male writers